Now That's What I Call Music! 64 may refer to:

 Now That's What I Call Music! 64 (UK series)
 Now That's What I Call Music! 64 (U.S. series)